The House of Olaf was a dynasty which ruled Denmark or part of Denmark in the late 9th century and early 10th century.

Olof the Brash
Gyrd and Gnupa (sons of Olof)
Sigtrygg Gnupasson (son of Gnupa and Asfrid, Odinkar's daughter)

The existence of Gnupa and Sigtrygg is confirmed by the two Sigtrygg Runestones.

Notes and references

9th century in Denmark
10th century in Denmark